Juan Sebastián Cabal and Alejandro Falla chose to defend 2008 title. However, they withdrew before their first match against Eric Gomes and Carlos Salamanca.
Sebastián Prieto and Horacio Zeballos won in the final 4–6, 6–3, [10–5], against Ricardo Hocevar and João Souza.

Seeds

Draw

Draw

References
 Doubles Draw

Seguros Bolivar Open Cali - Doubles
2009 Doubles